This page provides the party lists put forward in New Zealand's 1996 election. Party lists determine, in the light of country-wide proportional voting, the appointment of list MPs under the mixed-member proportional representation (MMP) electoral system. This was the first New Zealand election held under the MMP electoral system.

Successful parties
There were six parties successful at the 1996 election:

ACT

Alliance

New Zealand First

Labour Party

National Party

United New Zealand

Unsuccessful parties
There were 15 unsuccessful parties.

Advance New Zealand

Animals First

Aotearoa Legalise Cannabis

Asia Pacific United

Christian Coalition

Ethnic Minority

Green Society

Mana Māori Movement

McGillicuddy Serious

Natural Law

Conservatives

Superannuitants and Youth

Progressive Greens

Te Tawharau

Libertarianz

References

1996 New Zealand general election
Lists of New Zealand political candidates
Party lists